Terry McGovern may refer to:

Terry McGovern (boxer) (1880–1918), boxer who held the world bantamweight and featherweight titles
Terry McGovern (actor), American film actor, television broadcaster, radio personality, voice-over specialist, and acting instructor
Terry M. McGovern, educator and activist
Terry McGovern (rugby league), Australian rugby league player
Teresa McGovern (died 1994), daughter of U.S. political figure George McGovern